The International Heavy Haul Association is an association of Heavy Haul railways that researches problems with the rail-wheel interface.

Overview
The extreme axleloads found on mineral railways such as iron ore railways in the Pilbara and the repetitive pounding of the track by trains consisting of identical wagons was found to lead to deterioration of the track.  Research was needed to establish the exact cause and determine solutions. Since heavy haul railways exist in several countries, it seemed sensible to establish an association to investigate these problems jointly.

Members
Members as at October 2021 comprised:

Australia

References

External links
Official Site

International trade associations
International rail transport organizations
Rail freight transport
Railway associations